Qatar Volleyball (طائرة قطر) is a professional Volleyball team based in Doha, Qatar. It competes in the Qatari Volleyball League.

Honors
10 official championships.

Domestic
 Qatar Volleyball League
Winners (4): 1999, 2000, 2002, 2005

 Emir Cup
Winners (4): 1997, 2001, 2004, 2005

Crown Prince Cup
Winners (2): 2004, 2005

International
 GCC Club Championship
 Runners-up:2005

See also
 Qatar SC

Qatari volleyball clubs
Sports clubs in Doha
1959 establishments in Qatar